Fram is both a surname and a masculine given name. People with the name include:

Surname
 Edward M. Fram (1905–1955), Christian Iraqi businessman, merchant and philanthropist
 Jason Fram (born 1995), Chinese ice hockey player
 Leslie Fram, American media executive

Given name
 Fram Farrington (1908–2002), polar explorer

Masculine given names